Papai may refer to:

Football clubs
 Pápai FC, defunct Hungarian football club
 Pápai PFC, Hungarian football club

People
 Joci Pápai, Hungarian singer
 Al Papai, baseball pitcher
 Jim Papai, Canadian football player

Places
 Papai, Iran, a village
 Pápa District (Pápai járás), western Hungary